Mateusz Kossior (also spelled Kosior, Kossiur, Kossyor) or Mateusz Koło, was a Polish painter and sculptor of the late Renaissance. His dates of birth and death are unknown but he was active in the 16th century.

Originally from Koło, Kossior relocated to Poznań, where in 1575 he appeared before the City Council to complain against the local painter's guild. The City Council hosted a performance by the artist featuring an image of Madonna and Child. In the years 1579-1595 he was a senior member to several painters' guilds, the Department of Crafts, and bookbinders group. He was a well known and respected artist, and his art earned him a small property in Poznan. He also lived and worked in Kłecko, where he produced an altarpiece for the church.

Kossior was influenced by Dutch and Italian paintings. Patrons of the artist included the noble family Czarnkowscy.

The artist had four children:
 Ewa, wife of Jakub Staniewski and later Tomasz Pełka, both goldsmiths
 Stanisław Kossior or Kossiorowicz (died 1626), a member of the painters' guild in Poznan, painted the high altar in Szamotuły
 Barbara
 Jadwiga

References
 Marian Drozdowski Opalenica modern times. In: Czeslaw Luczak (ed.) (ed.), History Opalenicy. Poznan: ABOS, 1993, p 102 . (Polish)
 Aniela Sławska, Kossior Mateusz [in:] Polish Biographical Dictionary, Volume XIV, 1968–1969, p 301
 Dawid Jung, Wierszopisowie Kleck between 1590 and 1623. Contributions to the cultural history of Old Polish (Traditional Polish Library, Vol I), pp. 49–54.

Polish sculptors
Polish male sculptors
16th-century Polish painters
Polish male painters
Year of birth unknown
Year of death unknown
People from Koło County